North Dakota Highway 24 (ND 24) is a minor north–south highway contained entirely within Sioux County, North Dakota. It runs from one junction with ND 6 east of Selfridge near the South Dakota border to another junction on ND 6 west of Solen.

Route description
ND 24 begins at an intersection with ND 6 east of Selfridge, just north of the South Dakota–North Dakota state line. From there, it travels east until it meets ND 1806 south of Fort Yates. From there, the two routes run north concurrently, through Fort Yates and alongside the west bank of the Missouri River as part of the Lewis and Clark Trail. Just southwest of Cannon Ball, ND 24 splits from ND 1806 and heads west along the south bank of the Cannonball River, going through Solen, and terminating at an intersection with ND 6 near the unincorporated community of Breien.

Junctions

References

024
Transportation in Sioux County, North Dakota